Matrikamantra is a 2-CD album by the singer/songwriter Lydia Lunch, first released on October 31, 1997 by Atavistic/Figurehead Records in 1997 (ALP94CD), and a year later in Germany through Crippled Dick Hot Wax! (CDHW 050). The first disc is a studio album that contains new material, while the second disc contains a live performance recorded at Palace Acropolis in 1997.

Track listing

Personnel 
Harbinger House
Joseph Budenholzer – sound design
Joan Dalin – violin
Paul Geluso – mastering
Lydia Lunch – vocals
Laura Rogers – flute
Greg Shakar – clarinet, mastering
Live in Praque
Joseph Budenholzer – sound design
Tomáš Hadrava – mixing
Kamilsky – bass guitar, mastering, mixing
Lydia Lunch – vocals
Colin Stuart – mastering, mixing
Mr. Zak – mastering

References 

1997 albums
1997 live albums
Lydia Lunch albums